Rani Kumari Tiwari is a Nepalese politician. She is a member of Provincial Assembly of Madhesh Province from Loktantrik Samajwadi Party, Nepal. Tiwari, a resident of Manara, was elected via 2017 Nepalese provincial elections from Mahottari 3(B).

Electoral history

2017 Nepalese provincial elections

References

Living people
1979 births
Madhesi people
21st-century Nepalese women politicians
21st-century Nepalese politicians
Members of the Provincial Assembly of Madhesh Province
Loktantrik Samajwadi Party, Nepal politicians